Huopalahti railway station is a railway station on the VR commuter rail network located in northern Helsinki, Finland.

Huopalahti station is now situated in the district of Etelä-Haaga, but it was named for the municipality of Huopalahti, which was annexed to the city of Helsinki in 1946.

References

External links 

Railway stations in Helsinki
Haaga